Pomme C is the fourth studio album recorded by the French singer and songwriter Calogero. It was released on 12 March 2007 and achieved great success.

All lyrics were written by Zazie, who has already worked with Calogero on previous albums. The music was composed by Calogero, but he was helped by his brother Gioacchino for "Pomme C". The album was recorded in Italy, in Pergolato (Tuscany), in a house. Parts of the recording were also made in Belgium and France.

For him, this album is not that of the maturity nor the continuity of the previous album, 3 : it marked the beginning of a new musical style. The album was released in a simple and a collector editions on March 12, 2007, but also in a slidepack edition on February 27, 2008. The three singles released from this album were only available digitally in France, and as CD singles in Belgium (Wallonia).

Track listing
All writing by Zazie, all music by Calogero except where noted.

1 Hidden track

+ Bonus :
 "Le Saut de l'Ange" (video)

Charts and sales

Weekly charts

Year-end charts

Certifications

References

2007 albums
Calogero (singer) albums